Chimerica may refer to:

Chimerica, a term describing economic relations between China and the US
Chimerica (play), a play by Lucy Kirkwood
Chimerica (TV series), a 2019 British drama based on Kirkwood's play
Chimerica, a fictional Central American country that serves as the setting for Hidden Agenda